Walker Township, Indiana may refer to one of the following places:

 Walker Township, Jasper County, Indiana
 Walker Township, Rush County, Indiana

See also

Walker Township (disambiguation)

Indiana township disambiguation pages